Edgar W. Dawson (10 October 1931 – 28 June 2015) was an English professional rugby league footballer who played in the 1950s and 1960s.

Background
Edgar Dawson's birth was registered in Great Ouseburn district, West Riding of Yorkshire, England, he was a joiner, and he died in York Hospital, York.

Playing career

International honours
Edgar Dawson represented the English League XIII while at York in the 18-17 victory over France at Stade Vélodrome, Marseille on Sunday 21 October 1956, and in 19-8 victory over France at Headingley Rugby Stadium, Leeds on Wednesday 16 April 1958, and won a cap for Great Britain while at York in the 21-10 victory over Australia at Central Park, Wigan on Saturday 17 November 1956.

Edgar Dawson was selected for the 1958 Great Britain Lions tour of Australia, and New Zealand. However, prior to the tour he dislocated a shoulder when playing for York's 'A' team, and was unable to participate in the tour.

County Cup Final appearances
Edgar Dawson played  in York's 8-15 defeat by Huddersfield in the 1957 Yorkshire County Cup Final during the 1957–58 season at Headingley Rugby Stadium, Leeds on Saturday 19 October 1957.

Club career
Edgar Dawson made his début for York on Wednesday 30 August 1950, and played his last match on Friday 1 June 1962.

Honoured at York Rugby League
The first seven players to be inducted into the York Rugby League Hall of Fame during March 2013 were; Geoffrey Pryce, Gary Smith, Vic Yorke, Norman Fender, Willie Hargreaves, Basil Watts, and Edgar Dawson.

Genealogical information
Edgar Dawson's marriage to Theresa (née Gallagher (birth registered during fourth ¼ 1929 in York district)) was registered during third ¼ 1952 in York district. They had children; Paul Dawson (birth registered during third ¼  in Bulmer district), and Susan M. Dawson (birth registered during third ¼  in Howden district). Edgar Dawson was the younger brother of Mavis Dawson (birth registered during third ¼ 1929 in Great Ouseburn district), and the older brother of the rugby league footballer for York, Denis Dawson (birth registered during second ¼ 1937 in Great Ouseburn district), Maureen J. Dawson (birth registered during second ¼ 1940 in York district – 2015), and Denise A. Dawson (birth registered during fourth ¼ 1945 in York district). He had 5 great grandchildren, Jack Kellett, Emily Kellett, Alfie Kellett, Joshua Dawson and Grace Dawson.

His funeral took place at St Aelred's Roman Catholic Church  at 216 Fifth Avenue, Tang Hall, on Friday, 10 July 2015, at 12.15pm, followed by cremation at York Crematorium, Bishopthorpe Road at 1.40pm.

References

External links
!Great Britain Statistics at englandrl.co.uk (statistics currently missing due to not having appeared for both Great Britain, and England)
Fairfax of life
Fender the first of York's Lions
One of York's greatest-ever players, Edgar Dawson, passes away

1931 births
2015 deaths
English rugby league players
Great Britain national rugby league team players
Rugby league locks
Rugby league players from Harrogate
York Wasps players